James Smy (24 November 1907 – 29 July 1997) was an English professional footballer who played for Hampstead Town, Tottenham Hotspur and Sittingbourne.

Football career 
Smy joined Tottenham Hotspur after playing for Non league club Hampstead Town. The inside left scored six goals in 17 appearances for the Lilywhites between 1928 and 1930. After leaving White Hart Lane, Smy played for Sittingbourne where he ended his playing career.

References

External links
Smy fact file
Smy information 

1907 births
1997 deaths
Footballers from Edmonton, London
English footballers
Association football inside forwards
Hendon F.C. players
Tottenham Hotspur F.C. players
Sittingbourne F.C. players
English Football League players